The Verkehrsbetriebe Biel (in German) or Transports publics biennois (in French) is a public transport operator in and around the bilingual city of Biel/Bienne, in the Swiss canton of Bern. It operates the city's network of trolleybuses and motor buses, and is also known by its respective initials of VB and Tpb.

In 2014, the company also took over the town's two funicular railways:
Biel/Bienne–Leubringen/Evilard
Biel/Bienne–Magglingen/Macolin

See also 
 Trams in Biel/Bienne
 Trolleybuses in Biel/Bienne

Transport in Biel/Bienne